Woodcliff Lake is an active commuter railroad station in the borough of Woodcliff Lake, Bergen County, New Jersey. Located at the junction of Woodcliff Avenue (County Route 90) and Broadway (County Route 104) on the edge of the Woodcliff Lake Reservoir, the station is served by trains of New Jersey Transit's Pascack Valley Line. The station, which contains a single track and low-level side platform, is not accessible per handicapped persons under the Americans with Disabilities Act of 1990. As of November 8, 2020, Woodcliff Lake is serviced seven days a week by New Jersey Transit trains, having previously only been a single train on weekends and holidays up to that point.

History 
Railroad service through Woodcliff Lake began on May 27, 1871 when the Hackensack and New York Extension Railroad introduced service north from Hillsdale to Nanuet, New York. At that time, a station in the area was known as Pascack. The former station depot at Woodcliff Lake, in deplorable condition for multiple years attached to the existing depot, came down in December 1960 to be replaced by a police station outpost and improved parking for commuters.

Station layout
The station has one track and one low-level side platform.

Permit parking is operated by the Borough of Woodcliff Lake. A single permit parking lot, with 60 parking spots is available.

References

External links

Borough of Woodcliff Lake
Station House from Google Maps Street View

NJ Transit Rail Operations stations
Railway stations in Bergen County, New Jersey
Woodcliff Lake, New Jersey
Railway stations in the United States opened in 1871
1871 establishments in New Jersey